TravelerVIP.com, headquartered in Dubai, was a luxury hotel booking website in the Middle East.

History
Initially branded as RihlaPrime.com during its launch in April 2012, the travel company was founded by Blagoja Hamamdziev, John Fohr and Marc Meunier.  This original name was inspired by Arab Explorer Ibn Batūtah's journey, or 'Rihla', and offered members-only discounted vacations and destinations offers at up to 70%.
After initial success, it expanded its business model to provide more curated offers and wider selection of hotels and rebranded itself to TravelerVIP.com. In January 2013 it received $1 million in funds from BECO Capital, one of the top venture capital investment firms in the Middle East, and a consortium of angel investors, including Soha Nashaat, former CEO of Barclays Wealth MENA & Turkey and Jakob Beck Thompsen, CEO of SaxoBank MENA & Turkey.

Tailored to the Middle East traveler, TravelerVIP.com offers both weekly limited time sales on four and five star hotels, as well as the ability to book at the best available rates (BAR) on its collection of the top 1,000+ hotels in the World. The website features curated travel reviews for each hotels, and is offered in both English and Arabic. TravelerVIP.com had the world’s largest collection of originally written Arabic hotel reviews.

TravelerVIP is one of the first members of the ‘Majid Bin Mohammed Innovation Center in5’ which is an incubator for promising companies in the UAE.

TravelerVIP closed in 2014.

Middle East Travel
According to Euromonitor, online travel in the United Arab Emirates alone is worth $1.6bn. In 2012 the online travel market in the Middle East was US$10.4bn and is expected to reach US$15.8bn by 2014. VISA has stated that annual ecommerce spend has seen 40% annual growth and average online spend is among the highest worldwide according to the World Tourism Organization. Further opportunity lies in providing relevant product to Arabic speaking travellers because there is currently a limited amount of local language content.

References

Companies based in Dubai
Travel and holiday companies of the United Arab Emirates